Chinese Taipei participated at the 2015 Summer Universiade, in Gwangju, South Korea.

Taipei being the host city of the 2017 Summer Universiade, a Taiwanese segment was performed at the closing ceremony.

Medals by sport

Medalists

References
 Chinese Taipei Overview

External links

Nations at the 2015 Summer Universiade
2015
2015 in Taiwanese sport